The Gliding Club of Victoria was founded in 1937 and moved to the Benalla Airport in 1953. The club held the World Gliding Championships at Benalla in 1987 and 2017.

References
Gliding Club of Victoria

External links
 Gliding Club of Victoria

Flying clubs
Aviation in Victoria (Australia)
1937 establishments in Australia
Sports clubs established in 1937
Clubs and societies in Victoria (Australia)
Victoria
Sports teams in Victoria (Australia)
Sporting clubs in Melbourne
Gliderports in Australia